El Siglo (The Century) may refer to:

Newspapers
El Siglo de Torreón (Mexico)
El Siglo (Argentina)
El Siglo (Chile)
El Siglo (Panama)
El Siglo (Venezuela)
El Nuevo Siglo, a Colombian newspaper formerly titled El Siglo

Products
Siglo (cigar brand), a brand of premium cigars created by Frank Llaneza for cigar giant Altadis
Siglo (cryptocurrency), a cryptocurrency focusing on mobile network access and monetization